These are some of the notable events relating to politics in 2002.

Events

January
January 1- Eduardo Duhalde is appointed President of Argentina. He appoints Jorge Capitanich as cabinet chief, Carlos Ruckauf as foreign minister; Felipe Solá becomes governor of Buenos Aires.
January 1- Safet Halilović becomes President of the Federation of Bosnia and Herzegovina.
January 1- Manuel Andrade Díaz takes office as governor of Tabasco.
January 1- Kaspar Villiger becomes president of Switzerland; Pascal Corminboeuf becomes president of the Council of State of Fribourg; Claudio Lardi president of the government of Graubünden; Anita Rion president of the government of Jura; Ulrich Fässler Schultheiss of Luzern; Herbert Bühl president of the government of Schaffhausen; Rolf Ritschard Landammann of Solothurn; and Francine Jeanprêtre president of the Council of State of Vaud.
January 1- Michael Bloomberg takes office as mayor of New York City.
January 2- Levy Mwanawasa takes office as president of Zambia; Katele Kalumba becomes foreign minister.
January 4- Assad Shoman is sworn in as foreign minister of Belize.
January 6- Mikhail Lapshin wins Presidential run-off election in the Altai Republic.
January 7- Michelle Bachelet is named defense minister of Chile, becoming the first woman in Latin America to hold the post.
January 8- Kristiina Ojuland becomes foreign minister of Estonia.
January 8- John Farmer, Jr. becomes acting Governor of New Jersey, followed by John O. Bennett and then Richard Codey until governor-elect Jim McGreevey is sworn in.
January 10- Enrique Bolaños takes office as president of Nicaragua; Norman José Caldera Cardenal becomes foreign minister.
January 12- Mark Warner takes office as governor of Virginia.
January 13- In the Presidential runoff in Sakha, Vyacheslav Shtyrov is elected.
January 13- Diosdado Cabello is named executive vice-president of Venezuela.
January 14- Juan Babauta takes office as governor of the Northern Mariana Islands.
January 15- Bill Graham is named as foreign minister of Canada.
January 15- Pat Cox of Ireland is elected president of the European Parliament.
January 15- Vladimir Torlopov takes office as head of the Komi Republic.
January 18- P. S. Ramamohan Rao is sworn in as governor of Tamil Nadu.
January 18- Natalya Partasova is confirmed as prime minister of Chuvashia.
January 21- Yu Shyi-kun is named Premier of Taiwan; Eugene Chien is appointed as foreign minister; Fan Kuang-chun as governor of Taiwan Province.
January 22- Georgi Parvanov takes office as president of Bulgaria.
January 27- Ricardo Maduro takes office as president of Honduras; Guillermo Pérez Arias becomes foreign minister.
January 28- Imangali Tasmagambetov is appointed as the prime minister of Kazakhstan.

February
February 1- Yoriko Kawaguchi is named Foreign Minister of Japan.
February 4- Choi Sung Hong becomes foreign minister of South Korea.
February 8- Semyon Nazarov becomes prime minister of Sakha.
February 8- Hazret Medzhidovich Sovmen is sworn in as president of Adygea.
February 13- Amarinder Singh is sworn in as chief minister of Punjab.
February 14- Beriz Belkić becomes chairman of the Presidency of Bosnia and Herzegovina.
February 15- Angidi Chettiar becomes acting president of Mauritius who is soon replaced by Ariranga Pillay, and finally Karl Offmann.
February 15- Lázaro Cárdenas Batel is sworn in as governor of Michoacán
February 19- Mikhail Shatalov becomes prime minister of North Ossetia–Alania
February 22- Marc Ravalomanana declares himself President of Madagascar.

March
March 2- Narain Dutt Tiwari is sworn in as chief minister of Uttaranchal, now known as Uttarakhand.
March 3- Gabriel Costa's Movement for the Liberation of São Tomé and Príncipe wins parliamentary elections in São Tomé and Príncipe, he would later become Prime Minister.
March 4- Yvon Neptune is designated Prime Minister of Haiti.
March 4- Ibrahim Rugova is elected President of Kosovo; Bajram Rexhepi is appointed prime minister.
March 5- Mike Rann is sworn in as premier of South Australia.
March 6- Nikolay Demchuk is approved as prime minister of Adygeya.
March 7- James Bartleman takes office as lieutenant governor of Ontario.
March 15- Dragan Mikerević is elected Prime Minister of Bosnia and Herzegovina.
March 18- Modibo Keïta becomes Prime Minister of Mali.

April
April 1- Antonio Lazzaro Volpinari and Giovanni Francesco Ugolini take office as captains-regent of San Marino.
April 1- Hassan Muhammad Nur "Shatigadud" is sworn in as President of Southwestern Somalia.
April 1- Ernst Hasler takes office as Landammann of Aargau.
April 5- Otto Roberto Mendonça de Alencar becomes governor of Bahia; Benedita Souza da Silva Sampaio becomes governor of Rio de Janeiro.
April 6- José Manuel Durão Barroso is sworn in as prime minister of Portugal; António Martins da Cruz becomes foreign minister.
April 8- Alda Bandeira becomes Foreign Minister of São Tomé and Príncipe.
April 11- Sir John Vereker is sworn in as governor of Bermuda.
April 12- Pedro Carmona Estanga becomes president of the transitional government of Venezuela.
April 15- Ernie Eves becomes premier of Ontario.
April 18- Georg Milbradt becomes minister-president of the German of Free State of Saxony.
April 23- Charles-Louis Rochat becomes president of the Council of State of Vaud.
April 28- Nikolay Ashlapov becomes acting governor of Krasnoyarsk.
April 28- Bruno Koster is elected as Regierender Landammann of Appenzell-Innerrhoden.

May
May 1- Young Vivian is elected Prime Minister of Niue.
May 1- Thomas Burgener takes office as president of the Council of State of Valais; Ernst Buschor takes office as president of the government of Zürich.
May 2- Perry Christie is elected Prime Minister of The Bahamas, selects Fred Mitchell as Foreign Minister.
May 3- Dahir Riyale Kahin becomes President of Somaliland.
May 5- French Presidential elections, Jean-Pierre Raffarin named Prime Minister, Dominique de Villepin named Foreign Minister.
May 5- Jakob Kamm is elected Landammann of Glarus.
May 8- Abel Pacheco de la Espriella takes office as president of Costa Rica; Roberto Tovar Faja becomes foreign minister.
May 9- Acting governor installed in the Cayman Islands to serve until the arrival of Bruce Dinwiddy.
May 12- Sergey Katanandov takes office as head of the republic of Karelia.
May 13- Marcel Ranjeva named Foreign Minister of Madagascar.
May 16- Jean-Luc Harousseau becomes acting president of the Regional Council of Pays de la Loire.
May 16- Wolfgang Böhmer takes office as minister-president of the German state of Saxony-Anhalt.
May 20- Xanana Gusmão is sworn in as President of East Timor.
May 21- Patrizia Pesenti becomes president of the Council of State of Ticino.
May 22- Nikolay Tanayev is named acting Prime Minister of Kyrgyzstan
May 23- Murat Zyazikov is sworn in as president of Ingushetia.
May 27- Paddy Ashdown, Baron Ashdown, takes over as international high representative of Bosnia and Herzegovina.
May 27- Péter Medgyessy is elected prime minister of Hungary; László Kovács becomes foreign minister.
May 29- Petr Švec becomes acting mayor of Prague.
May 30- Roy Chaderton is sworn in as foreign minister of Venezuela.

June
June 1- Elisabeth Zölch-Balmer becomes president of the government of Bern; Pierre Hirschy becomes president of the Council of State of Neuchâtel; Hans Peter Ruprecht becomes president of the government of Thurgau; and Gabi Huber Landammann of Uri.
June 3- Etienne Ys becomes prime minister of the Netherlands Antilles.
June 3- Piet Meyer is sworn in as acting premier of Western Cape, to be eventually replaced by Marthinus van Schalkwyk.
June 7- The Pakistani Foreign Minister offers his resignation, and is eventually replaced by Inam ul-Haq.
June 7- Viktor Maslov takes office as head of the administration of Smolensk Oblast.
June 8- Amadou Toumani Touré is sworn in as president of Mali. He eventually names Lassana Traoré Foreign Minister.
June 10- François Lonseny Fall is named foreign minister of Guinea.
June 12- Mohlabi Tsekoa becomes foreign minister of Lesotho.
June 14- Askar Aitmatov becomes foreign minister of Kyrgyzstan.
June 21- Jamiruddin Sircar becomes acting President of Bangladesh.
June 22- Matthias Platzeck is sworn in as Minister-President of Brandenburg.
June 26- Álvaro Silva Calderón of Venezuela is elected Secretary-General of OPEC.
June 27- Koffi Sama is named Prime Minister of Togo.
June 28- Élisabeth Morin becomes president of the Regional Council of Poitou-Charentes.

July
July 1- Frits Goedgedrag takes office as governor of the Netherlands Antilles
July 1- Elsbeth Schneider-Kenel becomes president of the government of Basel-Land; Leo Odermatt becomes Landammann of Nidwalden; Hans Hofer becomes Landammann of Obwalden; Peter Schönenberger becomes Landammann of Sankt Gallen, and Friedrich Huwyler becomes Landammann of Schwyz.
July 4- Jan Peter Balkenende is asked to form a new government as Prime Minister of the Netherlands; he will select Jaap de Hoop Scheffer as foreign minister, and Johan Remkes as interior minister.
July 6- Rama Jois is named as governor of Jharkhand.
July 9- The governor of Maharashtra resigns, he will eventually be replaced by C K Thakkar.
July 9- Members of the Peruvian cabinet resign, and are eventually replaced by Luis Solari as prime minister and Allan Wagner Tizón as foreign minister.
July 9- Ana Palacios is named foreign minister of Spain.
July 11- Chang Sang is named Prime Minister of South Korea.
July 11- The Foreign Minister of Turkey resigns. He is to be replaced by Şükrü Sina Gürel.
July 12- Vladimír Špidla is appointed as prime minister of the Czech Republic. Cyril Svoboda will become Foreign Minister.
July 15- Igor Nemec is elected mayor of Prague.
July 18- A. P. J. Abdul Kalam is elected president of India.
July 22- K. R. Malkani is appointed as lieutenant governor of Puducherry.
July 24- Alfred Moisiu takes office as President of Albania.
July 27- New Zealand holds a general election, which Helen Clark's left-wing Labour Party wins, in coalition with the Progressive Party and confidence and supply from the United Future Party.

August
August 2- Saufatu Sopoanga is elected prime minister of Tuvalu by Parliament.
August 4- Congress chooses Gonzalo Sánchez de Lozada as president of Bolivia.
August 5- Parliament elects Sir Michael Somare as prime minister of Papua New Guinea.
August 7- Álvaro Uribe Vélez is sworn in as president of Colombia; Carolina Barco is sworn in as foreign minister.
August 9- Chang Dae Whan is named Prime Minister of South Korea.
August 14- Lyonpo Kinzang Dorji becomes prime minister of Bhutan.
August 26- Viktor Aleksentsev is appointed acting Prime Minister of Ingushetia.
August 28- Theo-Ben Gurirab becomes Prime Minister of Namibia.

September
September 1- Supachai Panitchpakdi of Thailand becomes director-general of the WTO.
September 2- Ange Mancini takes office as prefect of French Guiana.
September 5- Iajuddin Ahmed is declared President-elect of Bangladesh.
September 10- Kim Suk Soo is named Prime Minister of South Korea.
 September 15 - The Swedish general election leaves Prime Minister Göran Persson and the Social Democrats in power.
 September 30- Lena Hjelm-Wallén is named defense minister of Sweden.

October
October 1- Giuseppe Maria Morganti and Mauro Chiaruzzi are installed as Captains-regent of San Marino.
October 3- Aleksandr Khloponin is named acting governor of Krasnoyarsk.
October 3- Maria das Neves is named Prime Minister of São Tomé and Príncipe.
October 4- The King of Nepal would abolish his council of ministers, and would later hire Lokendra Bahadur Chand as Prime Minister.
October 5- Elections are held in Bosnia and Herzegovina. Dragan Čović, Mirko Šarović, and Sulejman Tihić elected to the three seat presidency for the Croats, the Serbs, and the Muslim seats respectively.
October 9- Driss Jettou is appointed Prime Minister of Morocco.
October 12- The first Rodrigues Regional Assembly opens in Mauritius. Claude Wong So would later be appointed as chief executive.
October 14- Tom Macan is sworn in as Governor of the British Virgin Islands.
October 18- Nikolay Dudov becomes acting governor of Magadan.

November
November 1- Edward Roberts is sworn in as lieutenant governor of Newfoundland and Labrador.
November 1- Branko Crvenkovski is elected Prime Minister of the Republic of Macedonia.
November 2- Mufti Mohammad Sayeed takes office as chief minister of Jammu and Kashmir in Indian-held Kashmir.
November 3- Parliamentary elections are held in Turkey. Abdullah Gül would later become Prime Minister, Yaşar Yakış Foreign Minister.
November 4- Dennis Fentie is elected Premier of the Yukon.
November 4- Idrissa Seck is appointed Prime Minister of Senegal.
November 5- Einars Repše is nominated for Prime Minister of Latvia, and is named Prime Minister 2 days later, Sandra Kalniete becomes Foreign Minister.
November 5- The Republicans regain control of the Senate and expand their majority in the US House in midterm elections.
November 6- Peer Steinbrück is elected minister-president of North Rhine-Westphalia.
November 7- Mikhail Babich is appointed Prime Minister of Chechnya
November 14- Franco Frattini is appointed foreign minister of Italy.
November 15- Hu Jintao is appointed general secretary of the Communist Party of China.
November 16- Viktor Yanukovych is asked to be Prime Minister of Ukraine
November 21- Zafarullah Khan Jamali is elected Prime Minister of Pakistan. He would later name Khurshid Mahmud Kasuri as Foreign Minister.
November 28- Pavel Bém is elected mayor of Praha.

December
December 1- Presidential elections are held in Slovenia; Anton Rop is named Prime Minister the next day.
December 1- Laurent Moutinot becomes president of the Council of State of Genève.
December 2- Frank Murkowski takes office as governor of Alaska; Linda Lingle takes office as governor of Hawaii.
December 3- Howard Pearce takes office as governor of the Falkland Islands.
December 3- Elections are held in Greenland, Hans Enoksen would later be sworn in as Prime Minister.
December 5- Fernando da Piedade Dias dos Santos is named Prime Minister of Angola.
December 8- Elections in Serbia fail to receive 50% of the popular vote, making them invalid. Nataša Mićić becomes acting president.
December 16- Jim Poston is sworn in as governor of the Turks and Caicos Islands.
December 20- Adnan Terzić is designated prime minister of Bosnia and Herzegovina.
December 27- Mwai Kibaki wins Presidential elections in Kenya.
December 27- Ishratul Ibad takes office as governor of Sindh.

Deaths
January 6- Former prime minister of Thailand, Sanya Thammasak.
January 19- Former prime minister of Finland, Martti Miettunen.
February 4- Former president of Malta, Agatha Barbara.
February 8- Former president of Singapore, Ong Teng Cheong.
March 8- Former prime minister and chairman of the Presidential Council of Benin, Justin Ahomadegbé.
March 12- Former president of Cyprus, Spyros Kyprianou.
March 22- Former governor-general of Papua New Guinea, Sir Kingsford Dibela.
April 16- Former president of Guatemala, Ramiro de León Carpio.
May 5- Former president of Bolivia, Hugo Banzer Suárez.
May 5- Former president of Dominica, Sir Clarence Augustus Seignoret.
May 19- Former prime minister of Australia, Sir John Grey Gorton.
June 4- Former president of Peru, Fernando Belaúnde Terry.
June 24- Former prime minister of Luxembourg, Pierre Werner.
July 13- Former prime minister and foreign minister of Peru, Guillermo Larco Cox.
July 14- Former president of the Dominican Republic, Joaquín Balaguer.
July 22- Former prime minister and foreign minister of Peru, Fernando Schwalb López Aldana.
August 30- Former prime minister of Jordan, Sharif Zaid Ibn Shaker.
September 8- Former president of Switzerland, Georges-André Chevallaz.
September 30- Former president of Switzerland, Hans-Peter Tschudi.
October 31- Former president of Greece, Michail Stasinopoulos.
December 5- Former prime minister of Myanmar, Ne Win.
December 22- Former president of Guyana, Desmond Hoyte.

 
Politics by year
21st century in politics
2000s in politics